Mark Huck (born August 2, 1957) is an American speed skater. He competed in the men's 5000 metres event at the 1984 Winter Olympics.

References

External links
 

1957 births
Living people
American male speed skaters
Olympic speed skaters of the United States
Speed skaters at the 1984 Winter Olympics
Sportspeople from Evanston, Illinois